II Gymnasium Split, also known as "Druga gimnazija, 54Ž, is a public high school located in Split, Croatia.  It specializes in modern languages.

Programs
In Croatia, grades are restarted upon entering high school, so the grades are 1st-4th. Next to the name of the subject is shown how many classes of the subject there are per week in each grade.

External links

Gymnasiums in Croatia
Buildings and structures in Split, Croatia
1992 establishments in Croatia
Educational institutions established in 1992